Panegyra sokokana is a species of moth of the family Tortricidae. It is found in Kenya.

The costal area and termen of the forewings are yellow, the former more orange along the edge with a few blackish dots. The remaining surface is grey with six transverse red lines. The hindwings are brownish grey with darker scaling on the veins.

Etymology
The species name refers to the type locality.

References

Endemic moths of Kenya
Moths of Africa
Tortricini
Moths described in 2012
Taxa named by Józef Razowski